Daniel Hege is an American orchestral conductor. He is currently the music director of the Wichita Symphony Orchestra and the Binghamton Philharmonic, and is the principal guest conductor of the Tulsa Symphony Orchestra.  Hege previously served as the music director of the former Syracuse Symphony Orchestra. He also makes numerous guest appearances with orchestras and music festivals across the country.

Biography 

Hege was born in Colorado and raised in Idaho to parents Carl and Anne, who he names as his role models. He attended the First Mennonite Church in Aberdeen, Idaho. He began piano lessons at the age of nine and realized at that age that music would be his ruling passion.

He has majors in history and music at Bethel College, graduating in 1987. His senior seminar paper was about how the composer Dmitri Shostakovich worked under the repressive Stalin regime in Russia in the mid-20th century. He went on to obtain a master's degree from the University of Utah in orchestral conducting, where he founded the University Chamber Orchestra.  
He studied at the University of Southern California with Daniel Lewis and at the Aspen Music Festival with Paul Vermel.

In 2004 Mr. Hege received an honorary doctorate in Humane Letters from Le Moyne College.

He is active as a guest clinician and adjudicates various musical competitions nationally.

He has three daughters  and lives in Jamesville, NY.

Positions held
 Music Director of the Wichita Symphony Orchestra (September 2010 – present) 
 Music Director of the Binghamton Philharmonic (May 2018 – present) 
 Principal Guest Conductor of the Tulsa Symphony Orchestra (September 2015 – present)
 Music Director of the Syracuse Symphony Orchestra (April 1999 – April 2011)
 Music Director of the Haddonfield Symphony, New Jersey (1997 - 2000) (Now known as Symphony in C)
 Music Director of the Encore Chamber Orchestra in Chicago (1993 - 1997)
 Music Director of the Chicago Youth Symphony (1993 - 1997) (was honored twice by the American Symphony Orchestra League for innovative programming while in this position)
 Associate Conductor of the Kansas City Symphony (1995 - 1996)
 Assistant, Associate and Resident Conductor of the Baltimore Symphony (1996–2001) 
 Music Director and Principal Conductor of the Young Musicians’ Foundation Debut Orchestra in Los Angeles (1990 - 1993) 
 Music Director of the Newton Mid-Kansas Symphony Orchestra  (1993 - 2004)
 Director of Instrumental Music at the Orange County High School of the Arts (1991 - 1993)
 Assistant Conductor of the Pacific Symphony (1991 - 1993)

Guest conductor roles 
Maestro Hege has performed or will perform as guest conductor for the following orchestras and festivals:
Akron Symphony Orchestra
Albany Symphony Orchestra
Amarillo Symphony Orchestra
Annapolis Symphony Orchestra
Aspen Music Festival
Auckland Philharmonia Orchestra, New Zealand
Baltimore Chamber Orchestra
Baltimore Symphony Orchestra
Bardi Symphony Orchestra of Leicester, England
Binghamton Philharmonic Orchestra
Boise Philharmonic
Brevard Music Center Summer Institute
Buffalo Philharmonic Orchestra
Calgary Philharmonic Orchestra, Canada
Charleston Symphony Orchestra
Charlotte Symphony Orchestra
Civic Orchestra of Chicago
Columbus Symphony Orchestra
Colorado Symphony Orchestra
Colorado Springs Philharmonic
Dayton Symphony Orchestra
Detroit Symphony Orchestra
Edmonton Symphony Orchestra
Elgin Symphony Orchestra
Eugene Symphony
Florida Orchestra
Grand Rapids Symphony
Grand Teton Music Festival
Grant Park Music Festival
Hartford Symphony Orchestra
Houston Symphony Orchestra
Illinois Symphony Orchestra
Indianapolis Symphony Orchestra
Kalamazoo Symphony Orchestra
Kansas City Symphony
Lake Placid Sinfonietta
Los Angeles Mozart Orchestra
Louisiana Philharmonic Orchestra
Louisville Orchestra
Madison Symphony Orchestra
Memphis Symphony Orchestra
Music Academy of the West
Naples Philharmonic Orchestra
National Orchestral Institute
National Repertory Orchestra
North Carolina Symphony Orchestra
OK Mozart International Festival
Olympia Philharmonic
Omaha Symphony Orchestra
Oregon Symphony Orchestra
Orlando Philharmonic Orchestra
Orquesta Sinfónico Nacional de Costa Rica
Pacific Symphony Orchestra
Phoenix Symphony Orchestra
Puerto Rico Symphony Orchestra
Rhode Island Philharmonic Orchestra
Rochester Philharmonic Orchestra
San Antonio Symphony Orchestra
San Diego Symphony
Santa Barbara Symphony Orchestra
Santa Rosa Symphony
Sarasota Orchestra
Seattle Symphony Orchestra
Singapore Symphony Orchestra
Skaneateles Music Festival
Spokane Symphony
St. Petersburg Symphony Orchestra, Russia
Stamford Symphony Orchestra
Symphony Orchestra of Lima, Peru
Syracuse Opera
Texas Music Festival
Toledo Symphony Orchestra
Tulsa Symphony Orchestra
Tucson Symphony Orchestra
Virginia Symphony Orchestra
Wintergreen Summer Music Festival

Recordings 
 Texas Music Festival, 2014, Nielsen: Symphony No. 4, Britten: Sinfonia da Requiem, Bartok: Miraculous Mandarin Suite, Blu-ray Disc Release
 SSO Big Band Bash, 2006
 Serenity Cedille, 2006, Label: Cedille 
 SSO Holiday Pops, 2002
 SSO Classics Concert, 2000
 Violin Concertos by Black Composers of the 18th & 19th Centuries, 1999, Label: Cedille , with violinist Rachel Barton and the Encore Chamber Orchestra (which was nominated for a 1998 NPR Heritage Award)
 Done Made My Vow, works of Adolphus Hailstork performed with the Baltimore Symphony Orchestra and Morgan State Choir
 The Gift, Label: Woodland Records, with oboist Brad Smith.

References 

Year of birth missing (living people)
Living people
American male conductors (music)
Aspen Music Festival and School alumni
Bethel College (Kansas) alumni
University of Utah alumni
University of Southern California alumni
Musicians from Wichita, Kansas
People from Iowa
21st-century American conductors (music)
21st-century American male musicians